Roland Schlosser (born August 23, 1982) is an Austrian fencer. He competed in the individual foil events at the 2012 Summer Olympics, 2008 Summer Olympics and 2004 Summer Olympics.

References

1982 births
Living people
Austrian male fencers
Austrian foil fencers
Olympic fencers of Austria
Fencers at the 2004 Summer Olympics
Fencers at the 2008 Summer Olympics
Fencers at the 2012 Summer Olympics
People from Bregenz
Sportspeople from Vorarlberg